Marine Industries Organization (MIO), formerly known as Marine Industries Group (MIG), is a defense industry complex subordinate to the Iranian defence ministry. It is the major producer of equipment for both naval forces of Iran, the Islamic Republic of Iran Navy and the Navy of the Islamic Revolutionary Guard Corps.

Subordinates
Subordinates of the MIO are:

Products
Subsidiaries of the MIO manufacture a wide range of maritime equipment, including submarines, high-speed boats, as well as principal surface combatants. Some of the products made by the MIO are:
 MIG-G-0800
 MIG-G-0900
 MIG-G-1900
 MIG-S-1800, built at Shahid Joolaee Industries
 MIG-S-2600, built at Shahid Joolaee Industries
 MIG-S-3700, built at Shahid Darvishi Industries
 MIG-S-4700, built at Shahid Darvishi Industries
 MIG-S-5000
 RIBs, built at Shahid Joolaee Industries
 , built at Shahid Darvishi Industries
 , built at Shahid Tamjidi Industries
 , built at Shahid Tamjidi Industries
 
 , built at Shahid Darvishi Industries
  research vessel, built at Shahid Mousavi Industries

See also
 Iranian Navy's Factories

References

Manufacturing companies based in Tehran
Government-owned companies of Iran
Shipbuilding companies of Iran
Defence companies of Iran